The Estadio Polideportivo Cincuentenario is an indoor arena in Formosa, Argentina. It hosts basketball, volleyball, futsal, boxing, handball and artistic events. Club La Unión plays at this stadium its home matches for the Liga Nacional de Básquet, the top level of the Argentine basketball league system. The same club  also has a volleyball team that plays its home matches for the Liga Argentina de Voleibol – Serie A1 at the Cincuentenario as well.

Facilities

It is part of a 40 hectares area located at the intersection of the avenues Paseo de Las Americas and Antarctica Argentina, that also includes the Antonio Romero football stadium, a kart track, a velodrome and a hostel.

The stadium occupies an area of 12,000 m2 and the sports flooring measures 48 meters long and 38 wide. In addition, the stadium offers seven broadcast booths with wireless internet (WI-FI), press area, four locker rooms, conference room, cafeteria, storage for sports elements, two gyms, central electronic four-headed scoreboard and two more screens.

Events

2008 FIBA Americas Under-18 Championship
South American Olympic men's qualification 2008
2010 Torneo Súper 8
2012 FIBA Americas League Final Four
2015 FIVB Volleyball World Grand Prix
2017 FIBA Under-16 Americas Championship

References 

Indoor arenas in Argentina
Basketball venues in Argentina
Volleyball venues in Argentina
Buildings and structures in Formosa, Argentina